David Herdies is a Swedish producer, director and the CEO of Momento Film.

Herdies, born David Olivier Knape, lives and works in Stockholm. In 2006, he started the film production company Filmfront STHLM together with Georg Götmark, where he directed and produced documentaries such as Citizen Oketch (2009) and The Guerilla Son (2011).

In 2011, Herdies started the production company Momento Film. Among his prior films can be mentioned Ouaga Girls by Theresa Traore Dahlberg (2017), the short film Madre by Simón Mesa Soto (Official Short Film Competition, Cannes 2016), Fragility by Ahang Bashi (Gothenburg Best Feature, Guldbagge for Best Newcomer, 2017) and Winter Buoy by Frida Kempff (Best International Documentary NIFF, 2015).

Filmography 
 Dogborn (2022)
 Ouaga Girls Directed by Theresa Traore Dahlberg, produced by David Herdies (2017)
 Fragility Directed by Ahang Bashi, produced by David Herdies (2016)
 Madre Directed by Simon Mesa Soto produced by David Herdies (2016)
 Dear Kid Directed by Frida Kempff, produced by David Herdies (2016)
 Miles of Sand Directed by Sonejuhi Sinha, produced by David Herdies (2016)
 Winter Buoy Directed by Frida Kempff, produced by David Herdies (2015)
 Att skiljas Directed by Karin Ekberg, produced by David Herdies (2014)
 While no one is watching Directed by David Herdies and Ulla Lemberg (2013)
 Give Us The Money Directed by Bosse Lindquist, produced by David Herdies (2012)
 :sv:Gerillasonen (The Guerilla Son) Directed by David Herdies and :sv:Zanyar Adami (2012)
 Fardosa Directed and produced by David Herdies (2010)
 Citizen Oketch Directed by David Herdies and Georg Götmark (2009)

Awards

References

External links
David Herdies on Swedish Film Database

Momento Film

1974 births
Living people
Swedish film producers
Documentary film producers
Swedish film directors